Gnathophis heterognathos is an eel in the family Congridae (conger/garden eels). It was described by Pieter Bleeker in 1858, originally under the genus Myrophis. It is a marine, temperate water-dwelling eel which is known from the western Pacific Ocean, including the southwestern Japanese Archipelago, the Philippines, and the South China Sea. It dwells at a depth range of 183–199 metres.

References

heterognathos
Fish described in 1858